Shaan Singh Hundal (born July 14, 1999) is a Canadian professional soccer player who plays as a forward for Vancouver FC in Canadian Premier League.

Early life
Hundal began playing youth soccer at age six with Caledon SC. He later played with Brampton Youth SC and Mississauga SC. He was also a member of the Ontario provincial team at the U14 and U15 level. In May 2014, he joined the Toronto FC Academy.

Club career
In 2016, he played a match with Toronto FC III in the Premier Development League, and also played with the team for two matches in 2018 in League1 Ontario. He scored a hat trick on May 20, 2018 against Toronto Skillz FC. 

In April 2016, he joined Toronto FC II in the USL, as an academy call-up, and made his professional debut on April 9 against FC Montreal. He scored his first professional goal on May 29 against the Wilmington Hammerheads. On September 1, 2016, he officially signed a professional contract with Toronto FC II. He was named to the USL's 20 under 20 list in back to back years, being ranked #13 in 2016 and #4 in 2017. In July 2018, he signed an extension with the team through the 2019 season. In March 2019, he briefly joined the Ottawa Fury on loan. He was later recalled by Toronto FC II, after only making one appearance for the Fury. He departed Toronto after the 2019 season.

In July 2020, Hundal signed with Valour FC in the Canadian Premier League. He had originally joined the club on trial in March, but the COVID-19 pandemic had put a halt to all team training. He made six appearances for the club during the seven-game shortened season. He departed the club following the season.

In April 2021, he signed with Fort Lauderdale CF in USL League One (who later re-branded to Inter Miami II upon their move to MLS Next Pro in 2022). He scored his first goal for the club on April 17, in a 1-0 victory over South Georgia Tormenta FC. On May 2, he scored a brace in a 2-1 victory over the Richmond Kickers. In his first season with the club, he led the team in scoring with 11 goals. At the end of the season, he was named a USL League One Second Team All-Star and was a finalist for the league's Young Player of the Year award. In July 2022, he signed a short-term loan agreement with their Major League Soccer parent club, Inter Miami CF.

In January 2023, he joined Vancouver FC in the Canadian Premier League.

International career
Born in Canada, to parents of Sikh Punjabi orgin, Hundal is eligible for the national teams of Canada and India.

In November 2013, Hundal made his debut in the Canadian youth program at a Canada U15 identification camp. After attending multiple camps with the Canada U15, Canada U17, and Canada U18 teams, he was called up to the Canada U20 team for the first time for a camp in November 2016. He was subsequently named to the roster for the 2017 CONCACAF U-20 Championship, where he scored his first international goal against Antigua and Barbuda U20 on February 23, 2017. In January 2018, he was called to a camp with the Canada U23 team.

Career statistics

Notes

References

External links 
 
 

1999 births
Living people
Association football forwards
Soccer players from Brampton
Canadian soccer players
Canada men's youth international soccer players
Canadian sportspeople of Indian descent
Canadian people of Punjabi descent
League1 Ontario players
USL League Two players
USL League One players
USL Championship players
Canadian Premier League players
MLS Next Pro players
Toronto FC players
Toronto FC II players
Ottawa Fury FC players
Valour FC players
Inter Miami CF II players
Vancouver FC players